Invasive species are a significant threat to many native habitats and species of the United States and a significant cost to agriculture, forestry, and recreation. The term "invasive species" can refer to introduced/naturalized species, feral species, or introduced diseases. Some introduced species, such as the dandelion, do not cause significant economic or ecologic damage and are not widely considered as invasive. Economic damages associated with invasive species' effects and control costs are estimated at $120 billion per year.

Notable invasive species

Economic impact

The economic impacts of invasive species can be difficult to estimate. especially when an invasive species does not affect economically important native species. This is partly because of the difficulty in determining the non-use value of native habitats damaged by invasive species and incomplete knowledge of the effects of all of the invasive species present in the U.S. Estimates for the damages caused by well-known species can vary as well. The Office of Technology Assessment (OTA) has estimated zebra mussel economic effects at $300,000 per year, while a United States Army Corps of Engineers study put the number at $1 billion per year. The United States government spends an estimated $1 billion annually to recover from the invasive Formosan termite, investing $1 billion of this budget in areas surround New Orleans, a major port city. Estimates of total yearly costs controlling invasive species range from $1.1 billion to $137 billion per year.

In 1993, the OTA estimated that a total of $100 million is invested annually in invasive species aquatic weed control in the U.S. Introduced rats cause more than $19 billion per year in damages, exotic fish cause up to $5.4 billion annually, and the total costs of introduced weeds are estimated at around $27 billion annually. The total damage to the native bird population from invasive species is approximately $17 billion per year. Approximately $2.1 billion in forest products are lost each year to invasive plant pathogens, and a conservative estimate of the losses to livestock from exotic microbes and parasites was $9 billion per year in 2001.

Government policies and management efforts
The federal government has historically promoted the introduction and widespread distribution of species that became invasive, including multiflora rose, kudzu, and others for numerous reasons. Before the 20th century, numerous species were imported and released without government oversight, such as the gypsy moth and house sparrow. Over 50% of flora recognized as invasive or noxious weeds were deliberately introduced to the United States, by either government policy or individuals. Current government policy can be broadly separated into two categories: preventing entry of a potential invasive species and controlling the spread of species already present. This is carried out by different government agencies, depending on what types of damage a species can cause.

Regulations

The Lacey Act of 1900 was originally designed to protect game wildlife. Its role has increased to prohibit parties from bringing non-native species into the country that have the potential to become invasive. The Lacey Act gives the United States Fish and Wildlife Service (FWS) the power to list a species as "injurious" and regulate or prohibit its entry into the U.S. The Alien Species Prevention and Enforcement Act of 1992 makes it illegal to transport through the mail a plant or animal deemed injurious. The FWS concerns itself mostly with the invasive species likely to threaten sensitive habitats or endangered species.

The United States Department of Agriculture (USDA) is also involved in preventing the introduction of invasive species, largely through the Animal and Plant Health Inspection Service, or APHIS. APHIS was originally tasked with preventing damage to agriculture and forestry from alien species, pests, or diseases, but has had its mission expanded to include preventing invasive species spread as well. This includes identifying potential pests and diseases, assisting in international and domestic eradication efforts, and the  Smuggling Interdiction and Trade Compliance Program, designed initially to deal with illegally imported produce, but now tasked with preventing the entry of exotic pests, diseases, and potentially invasive species. APHIS also enforces bans against interstate transport of pests, diseases, and species listed as injurious, noxious weeds, or nuisance species. An example of the USDA banning imports is the ban on fresh mangosteen fruit because of concerns about fruit flies from southeast Asia. This ban originally allowed only frozen or canned fruit, but now allows for fresh irradiated fruit to enter.

Control

Many invasive species are spread inadvertently by human activities, such as seeds stuck to clothing or mud transporting firewood, or through ballast water. The government has instituted several different policies related to different pathways the invasive species may be spread. For example, quarantines on a federal and state level exist for firewood across the Eastern United States in an attempt to halt the spread of the emerald ash borer, gypsy moth, oak wilt, and others. Transporting firewood out of quarantine zones can result in a fine of up to $1 million and 25 years in jail, but punishments are usually much lower.

The techniques available for controlling the spread of invasive species can be broadly defined into six categories:
Cultural practices, including controlled burns and timbering. An example of this in action is the use of prescribed burns in the Everglades to control Melaleuca quinquenervia trees. The burns destroy Melaleuca but not native species which have adapted to wildfires, which were common but are now suppressed.
Interference with dispersal, which may include fencing, reducing accidental seed transport, and the construction of barriers, such as the electric barriers to prevent the spread of Asian carp.
Mechanical removal, including mowing, harvesting, manual removal, trapping, and culling. Many invasive plants, such as garlic mustard, can regrow quickly after mowing and must be removed by the roots or chemically.
Chemical control, which may include the use of approved pesticide or herbicide, or vaccines to control invasive diseases. Sea lampreys in the Great Lakes have had their numbers significantly reduced by a lampricide that kills larvae, which hatch in streams, before they can enter the lakes. The lampricide is responsible for reducing the sea lamprey population in the Great Lakes from over 3 million in the 1950s to around 450,000 today, which has potentially rescued several Great Lakes fisheries.
Biological control, which can involve the release of specific predators/herbivores, parasites, or diseases designed to control an invasive species without damaging native ones. One example of this is the city of Chattanooga's use of goats to control kudzu growing on mountain ridges. The goats, guarded from predators by llamas, eat the vine often enough to slowly starve the roots, killing the plant. This method is much cheaper than the repeated mowing or herbicidal spraying that would otherwise be necessary. Goats reach areas that are inaccessible to machines and have multi-chambered stomachs which coupled with their grazing technique mean that goats leave few seeds behind to sprout again.
Interference with reproduction, which can include the release of mating-disrupting pheromones or the release of sterile males. Field tests are underway to study the control of sea lampreys in the Great Lakes by the use of pheromone-baited traps in streams, in addition to current chemical controls. When female sea lampreys return to the stream to breed, they are drawn to the traps and captured, preventing reproduction.

An integrated pest management (IPM) approach, as defined by the National Invasive Species Council, uses scientific data and population monitoring to help determine the most efficient control strategy, which is usually a combination of several of the methods listed above. Agencies are encouraged to use an adaptive management strategy, involving regular reviews on the efficiency of their policies and conduct research into better methods.

Inter-department cooperation
Invasive species control is not overseen by a single government agency. For example, eight agencies (divisions) of the USDA work on invasive species issues, including the Agricultural Research Service, Animal and Plant Health Inspection Service, Cooperative State Research, Education, and Extension Service, Economic Research Service, Farm Service Agency, Foreign Agricultural Service, United States Forest Service, and the Natural Resources Conservation Service. Different invasive species are controlled by different agencies. For example, policies aimed at controlling the emerald ash borer are undertaken by the USDA because national forests, the body coordinating emerald ash borer control efforts, are within the USDA's purview. The National Invasive Species Council (NISC) was created by executive order in 1999 and charged with promoting efficiency and coordination between the numerous federal invasive species prevention and control policies. The NISC is co-chaired by the secretaries of the three federal departments that are charged with invasive species control: Department of Interior, Department of Commerce, and the USDA.
 Many state efforts use a similar council model to coordinate state agencies.

Education and outreach

Many of the policies used to contain invasive species, such as firewood transport bans or cleaning shoes and clothes after hiking, are effective only when the general public knows of their existence and importance. Because of this, numerous programs have been implemented to inform the public about invasive species. This includes placing signs at boat ramps, campsites, state borders, hiking trails, and numerous other locations as reminders of policies and potential fines associated with breaking policies. There are also numerous government programs aimed at educating children, as well as promoting volunteer efforts at removal and the many ways citizens can prevent the spread of invasive species.

Invasive species by area

Great Lakes

Current efforts in the Great Lakes ecoregion focus on measures that prevent the introduction of invasive species. As a major transport area, a number of invasive species have already been established within the Great Lakes. In 1998, the United States Coast Guard, in accordance with the National Invasive Species Act of 1996, established a voluntary ballast water management program. In 2004 this voluntary program became mandatory for every ship entering U.S.-controlled waters. Current measures are among the most stringent in the world and require ships entering from outside the Exclusive Economic Zone to flush ballast water in open seas or retain their ballast water for the length of their stay in the Great Lakes. Failure to comply with the U.S. Coast Guard’s regulations can result in a class C felony.

Another preventative measure in the Great Lakes region is the presence of an electrified barrier in the Chicago Sanitary and Ship Canal. The barrier is meant to keep Asian carp from reaching Lake Michigan and the other Great Lakes. On December 2, 2010, Michigan, Ohio, Pennsylvania and Wisconsin were denied their request to force the closing of the canal by the United States district court. The closing of the canal would have once again separated Lake Michigan and the Mississippi river system. States argued that the canal, and the Asian carp in it, posed a risk to $7 billion worth of industry. Currently the electric barrier is the only preventative measure and some question its effectiveness, particularly following the discovery of Asian carp DNA past the barrier. The discovery of DNA of Asian carp could be linked to live bait used around the Great Lakes region. The method for identifying the DNA is called environmental DNA (eDNA) surveillance. This method uses DNA that is left in the environment to identify species in low abundances.

In June 2022, the Illinois Department of Natural resources announced a campaign to rebrand Asian carp as Copi. The Copi renaming is a part of a Federal and state initiative to get the public to eat the invasive fish, decrease its numbers in Midwestern waterways, and prevent its introduction to the Great Lakes.

The federal United States Environmental Protection Agency -- the Great Lakes Restoration Initiative - is funding the Copi rebrand of Asian carp.

Rocky Mountains 

The USDA Rocky Mountain Research Station has a specific Invasive Species Working Group to do the research about invasive species in Rocky Mountain region. The Invasive Species Working Group focuses on four key areas: prediction and prevention; early detection and rapid response; control and management; restoration and rehabilitation. Specific approaches include prioritizing of invasive species problems, increased collaboration among agencies regarding those problems, and accountability for the responsible use of the limited resources available for invasive control.

Invasive species of particular concern in the Rocky Mountain region include: cheatgrass; leafy spurge; tansy ragwort; spotted knapweed; bufflegrass; saltcedar; white pine blister rust; armillaria root rot; introduced trout species; golden algae; spruce aphid; and banded elm bark beetle.

Colorado River

Already stressed by water management and damming, the Colorado River is losing its big-river fish community to combined effects of predation and competition by introduced non-native fishes. This fish community includes four large fishes that are listed as endangered by the U.S. Fish and Wildlife Service. One of these, the Colorado pikeminnow, is the largest minnow native to North America and is known for its spectacular fresh water spawning migrations and homing ability. Despite a massive recovery effort, its numbers are in decline. Hampered by a loss of about 80% of its habitat, the young of this once abundant fish is overwhelmed in its nursery habitat by invasive small fishes – such as red shiner and fathead minnow – whose numbers are as high as 90% of the standing stocks. Its juveniles and adults now must also compete with and are preyed upon by introduced northern pike, channel and flathead catfishes, largemouth and smallmouth basses, common carp, and other fishes. However, the listing of these non native sport fish as invasive is controversial, as the fish are popular among anglers, who criticize the science used by government agencies and assert that nonnative species are largely a scapegoat in the decline of endemic Colorado River basin fish.  Instead, they blame changes to the riparian environment primarily to dams and water diversions.

Florida Everglades

In 1994, the Everglades Forever Act of 1994 was passed to help in controlling Florida's water supply, recreation areas, and diverse flora and fauna. In addition to control and prevention measures the act also calls for efforts to monitor the distribution of known invasive species.

One invasive species occurring in the Everglades that can have serious consequences is the Burmese python. Between 2000 and 2010, approximately 1,300 of the snakes were removed from the Everglades. Currently the National Park Service  is researching control measures for the Burmese python in order to limit the species effects on the delicate Everglades ecosystem.

Pacific Northwest

In the Pacific Northwest, non-native invasive species (NIS) present significant threats to native ecosystems, biological diversity, and the stability of soil and hydrologic systems. NIS disrupt hydroelectric dams and irrigation systems, increase the spread of wildlife diseases, increase wildfire intensity and frequency, and cost billions of dollars to the region’s economy.

Invasive species are spreading in the Pacific Northwest at unprecedented rates due to large volumes of trade, tourism, and global climate change.

Gulf Coast 
The Gulf South is an area that historically has been proven to be particularly susceptible to the introduction of non-native invasive species. The porous nature of this region and the numerous ports that reside within it contribute in large part to the introduction of non-native aquatic species. This region is home to one of the nation's most active ports (the Port of New Orleans), in addition to numerous other large ports in Houston, Mobile, Gulfport, etc. The Mississippi River provides access to 14,500 miles of connecting waterways throughout North America through the Mississippi Delta by way of the Port of New Orleans, providing for a path of little resistance for non-native species to disperse throughout the region. Among the most notable species introduced to the Gulf Coast by way of ocean-going vessels docking in these ports are: the Formosan termite arriving by way of wooden pallets unloaded in Houston during the 1940s, fire ants arriving by way of soil shipments from South America from the 1910s to 1940s, Asian tiger mosquitoes arriving through Houston during the 1980s by way of stagnant water trapped in used tires.

On the coast itself, the aquatic plant species of primary concern is the Salvinia (both giant and common). This plant was listed as a Federal Noxious Weed in 1981, before this classification it arrived in America by way of Brazil to be used as a novelty plant in aquatic gardens/aquariums. These plants grow entirely or partially submerged in water, and their areas of influence include wetlands, lakes, rivers, estuaries, coastal zones, irrigation systems, hydroelectric systems, and aquaculture facilities. In areas where this plant is allowed to flourish unchecked, it often engrosses entire riverways and lakes. For example, Lake Bistineau and Caney Lakes in Webster Parish, Louisiana were entirely choked out by this invasive aquatic weed. This plant has an incredible capacity to dominate competing organisms within its ecosystem, it owes this status to its short reproductive cycle, high genetic variability, and to the fact that it can survive in nearly any type of aquatic environment.

The most problematic terrestrial plant species of this region is the Chinese Tallow tree, which was introduced to the United States in the 1700s for the purpose of cultivation in commercial nurseries. The plant was primarily cultivated for its seeds, which produce a waxy substance used in soapmaking. This tree has infiltrated the entirety of the Southeast United States, spanning from East Texas all the way to North Carolina, but it is especially prolific in the Gulf South Region. This species is particularly damaging due to the fact that its root systems change the chemical balance of soil, which in turn serves to alter the composition and structure of the native ecosystem's plant life. These trees have experienced a rapid expansion throughout the Gulf Coast region and, due to the fact that they out-compete much of the native vegetation, they threaten these areas by creating a lack of diversity which will inevitably lead to the creation of a dangerous mono-culture. Additionally, when found in wetland or marsh communities (like those found all throughout the Gulf Coast), this tree has been shown to adversely affect the amphibian and reptile populations of those regions.

The lone mammalian species threatening the gulf coast is a large rodent known as the nutria. This species was brought to Louisiana by way of South America in hopes of bolstering a domestic fur trade. However, enough of these animals escaped and made their homes in the thousands of coastal bayous and waterways to have become a problem. These rats annually damage 100,000 acres of coastal wetlands with their ravenous appetite for aquatic plants, making this already vulnerable region even more susceptible to coastal erosion. Additionally, they are notorious for destroying crop yields. Nutria rats have been the target of one of the most well-known and effective control programs ever utilized by environmental protection agencies. The state of Louisiana offers $6 per Nutria tail delivered to collection centers run by local wildlife and fisheries authorities. The projected annual goal of this program is to harvest 400,000 nutria annually.

Restoration efforts

Non-native invasive species may be as disruptive as climate change to the Pacific Northwest and prevention and management efforts are acutely underfunded.

Since the Pacific Northwest was one of last regions of the United States to be fully colonized by Europeans, a greater proportion of native ecosystems remain intact than elsewhere on the continent.

Major conservation efforts are directed towards native Pacific Salmon because they provide substantial benefits to countless species and the general health and function of coastal ecosystems. Although hydroelectric dams, hatcheries, harvest, and habitat loss dominate the discourse on salmon population decrease in the Pacific Northwest, non-native invasive species (NIS) may have a greater impact than all of these four aspects combined through the mechanisms of predation, competition, infection, and habitat modification.

The removal of non-native invasive species (NIS) from Pacific Northwest forests can increase the quantity and diversity of native herbs and woody plants within a short time frame and without human intervention through passive forest recovery mechanisms.

Soil pathogens pose a significant barrier to ecological restoration efforts across multiple habitats in the Pacific Northwest as non-native invasive species are notably less vulnerable to pathogen attack than native ones.

Specific non-native invasive species can actually assist efforts to conserve native species by generating shelter and food for rare species, carrying out beneficial ecological services, providing functional replacements for extinct species, and possessing greater resilience to land and climate changes.

Climate change 

The lack of knowledge on the present and future effects of climate change on the biota of the Pacific Northwest is vast, just a sprinkling of studies address this issue.

Ecologists hypothesize that the effects of climate change on NIS in the Pacific Northwest are likely to include: (1) different introduction modalities, (2) altered impacts of existing NIS, (3) different distribution patterns of existing NIS, (4) increased biological invasions, and (5) altered efficacy of current NIS management techniques.

Invasive species by state

Arizona

California

California has created a policy system towards invasive species, including Invasive Species Council of California (ISCC), California Invasive Species Advisory Committee (CISAC) and California Invasive Plant Council (Cal-IPC), a non-profit organization. The ISCC represents the highest level of leadership and authority in state government regarding invasive species. The ISCC is an inter-agency council that helps to coordinate and ensure complementary, cost-efficient, environmentally sound and effective state activities regarding invasive species. CISAC advises the ISCC, and created the California list of invasive species. California has many diverse ecoregions, and numerous endemic species that are at risk from invasive species.

Connecticut

Florida

Invasive species in Florida currently make up more than 26% of the animal population and a full one third of the flora population.  
In 2015, the presence of the invasive land planarian Platydemus manokwari was recorded from several gardens in Miami. Platydemus manokwari is a predator of land snails and is considered a danger to endemic snails wherever it has been introduced.

Hawaii

Measures to prevent the introduction and spread of invasive species are coordinated by the Hawaii Invasive Species Council. Currently the council is broken into five committees which focus on different areas of invasive species control. These focus areas are: prevention, management of established pests, increased public awareness, research and technology, and monetary resources.

Currently, Hawaii requires inspection of any and all plant, animal and microorganism transports. This includes transports from the mainland in addition to transports occurring between islands. Travelers are required to fill out a declaration form for each journey. Failure to declare these transports can result in up to one year imprisonment or a $250,000 fine. Many potential invasives or carriers for invasives require permits and quarantine periods before entry to the state is allowed.

In addition, there are other preventative measures such as a hotline for reporting sightings of known potential invaders like the brown tree snake.

Idaho
The Idaho Department of Agriculture has around 300 introduced or exotic species listed with 36 classified as noxious weeds. The legal designation of noxious weed for a plant in Idaho can use these four criteria:

It is present in but not native to state-province-ecosystem.
It is potentially more harmful than beneficial to that area.
Its management, control, or eradication is economically and physically feasible.
The potential adverse impact of it exceeds the cost of its control.

Some of the plants on Idaho's noxious weed list that are harmful or poisonous are:
Leafy spurge (Euphorbia virgata): native to Eurasia. It has a milky latex in all its parts that can produce blisters and dermatitis in humans, cattle, and horses and may cause permanent blindness if rubbed into an eye.
Poison hemlock (Conium maculatum): native to Europe. It contains highly poisonous alkaloids toxic to all classes of domesticated grazing animals. Agonopterix alstroemeriana is used as a biological control method for the plant, which in high larval numbers can kill large areas of the poisonous plant.
Russian knapweed (Acroptilon repens): native to the Caucasus in southern Russia and Asia. It causes chewing disease in horses.
Tansy ragwort: native to Eurasia. All parts are poisonous, it causes liver damage to cattle and horses, while it affects sheep to a lesser extent.
Toothed spurge (Euphorbia dentata): native further east and south, but not native to Idaho. A milky latex exists in all parts of the plant that can produce blisters and dermatitis in humans, cattle, and horses. It may cause permanent blindness if rubbed into the eye.
Yellow starthistle (Centaurea solstitialis): native to the Mediterranean basin area and Asia. It causes death and chewing disease in horses.
Yellow toadflax (Linaria vulgaris): native to Europe. It contains a poisonous glucoside that may be harmful to livestock.

Louisiana
New Orleans, the "gateway to the Mississippi", is a porous port city with rich soils. In turn, many aquatic plants are introduced to the region, making Louisiana the state with the second largest list of invasive aquatic species, second to Florida.

The "Dirty Dozen" details a list of the United States' most destructive invasive species. Of the twelve, four are identified in the state, including the zebra mussel, tamarisk, hydrilla, and Chinese tallow.

Maryland

Nevada

New Jersey

New Mexico

New York

The New York State Department of Environmental Conservation works with stewards of natural resources, non-profits and citizen scientists to detect, record and manage invasive species. These collaborations are organized into eight Partnerships for Regional Invasive Species Management (PRISMs) throughout the state. PRISMS perform the following tasks: plan regional invasive species management;develop early detection and rapid response capacity; implement eradication projects; educate the public in cooperation with DEC contracted Education and Outreach providers; coordinate PRISM partners; recruit and train volunteers; support research through citizen science.

Counties of New York list invasive species in varying order of threat. Insects considered invasive include: Asian longhorned beetle; emerald ash borer; and spotted lanternfly.

Oregon

Pennsylvania

Pennsylvania has a Governor's Invasive Species Council which devises action plans to deal with threats to the Commonwealth's agricultural and natural resources.
Spotted lanternfly is one of the newest and most urgent threats to businesses in Pennsylvania including vineyards and wineries, orchards and hops producers.

Rhode Island
Species of concern in Rhode Island include burning bush (Euonymus alatus), Oriental bittersweet (Celastrus orbiculatus), and purple loosestrife (Lythrum salicaria).

Texas

Utah

West Virginia

Wisconsin

See also
List of invasive species in North America
List of invasive species in the Mid-Atlantic region of the United States
Environmental issues in the United States
Fauna of the United States

References

External links

 
United States